Dipsan Tirkey (born 15 October 1998) is an Indian field hockey player who plays as a defender. He was the vice-captain of the Indian squad that won the 2016 Men's Hockey Junior World Cup.

Life and career
Tirkey was born on 15 October 1998 in Saunamara village of Sundergarh district to a farmer father and housewife mother. Due to his family's difficult financial situation, he had to practice hockey with a borrowed hockey stick on the village roads. Inspired by his elder brother Prashant to take up the sport, he joined the State Sports Hostel in Rourkela in 2009 where he learned the game.

Tirkey first played for the India junior team at the 2014 Sultan of Johor Cup. The same year, he was picked by the Kalinga Lancers franchise in the Hockey India League. He also captained the Indian junior team for EurAsia Cup in Russia and England tour in July 2016.

Tirkey was the vice-captain and the youngest member of the Indian squad that went unbeaten en route to the title at the 2016 Men's Hockey Junior World Cup in Lucknow.

References

External links
Dipsan Tirkey at Hockey India

1998 births
Living people
People from Sundergarh district
Indian male field hockey players
Field hockey players from Odisha
Male field hockey defenders